The Allahabad Address was a speech by scholar, Sir Muhammad Iqbal, one of the best-known in Pakistani history. It was delivered by Iqbal during the 21st annual session of the All-India Muslim League, on the afternoon of Monday, 29 December 1930, at Allahabad in United Provinces (U. P.). In this address Iqbal outlined a vision of an independent state for the great Muslim-majority provinces in northwestern India, thus becoming the first politician to articulate what would become known as the Two-nation theory—that Muslims are a distinct nation and thus deserve political independence from other regions and communities of India.

Allama Iqbal defined the Muslims of India as a nation and suggested that there could be no possibility of peace in the country unless and until they were recognized as a nation and under a federal system, the Muslim majority units were given the same privileges which were to be given to the Hindu majority units. It was the only way in which both the Muslims and the Hindus could prosper in accordance with their respective cultural values. In his speech, he emphasized that unlike Christianity, Islam came with "legal concepts" with "civic significance," with its "religious ideals" considered as inseparable from social order: "therefore, the construction of a policy on national lines, if it means a displacement of the Islamic principle of solidarity, is simply unthinkable to a Muslim."

Iqbal thus stressed not only the need for the political unity of Muslim communities but the undesirability of blending the Muslim population into a wider society not based on Islamic principles. However, he would not elucidate or specify if his ideal Islamic state would construe a theocracy, even as he rejected secularism and nationalism. The latter part of Iqbal's life was concentrated on political activity. He would travel across Europe and West Asia to garner political and financial support for the League, and he reiterated his ideas in his 1932 address, and during the Third Round-Table Conference, he opposed the Congress and proposals for transfer of power without considerable autonomy or independence for Muslim provinces.

History
 
The Hindu-Muslim question had great importance and stood crucial to British Indian history after 1857, especially in the 20th century. But the key issue for Muslims remained "separate identity." On several occasions and addresses, the issue gets highlighted that the Muslims are a separate nation with different culture and civilization, interests and rights. The Two-Nation Theory was not accepted by the Muslims, Hindus and the British peoples because they believed in "territorial nationalism". The Congress' perspective of Hindu Muslim relationship was that any perceived rift between the Hindus and Muslims was the product of the British divide and rule policy. According to the Congress, the British had consciously created splits and divisions, therefore it was an artificial issue which should not be emphasized. For Muslims it was the core issue, "I" was the central issue, it related to their culture, civilization, heritage and the type of arrangement that were to be done in the future political and constitutional arrangements of India.

The Idea of separate Homeland based on many issues, the first was the decline and degeneration of the Muslims. Most of the Muslim states became the colonies of the European states. Then the industrial revolution, development of science and technology became a preserve of the European nations. So, the question for Muslims was why the decline and degeneration have set in among the Muslims. The second issue was how to work for revival and regeneration of Muslims in general and how Muslims could overcome the decline and again assume their rightful place in the international system. The third issue was specific to the Muslims of South Asia who shared the problems of the Muslims as a whole, problem of decline and degeneration but in addition to this certain specific problems which pertain to British India and one important problem which Muslim faced was that that of minority, the majority were not Muslims and this makes the situation in British India different from the situation in the Middle Eastern Countries where Muslims were in majority. In British India the problem was that they could be overwhelmed by the other community, therefore they were emphasizing on their identity, value, culture and also heritage and civilization which they thought and emphasize time and again that it gave them a different, distinct and an exclusive identity. They were not simply a minority but a community and a nation. The reason was that they did not want to be absorbed into the majority community.

Phases of development
By 1930, this sentiment had developed very clearly which was very much demonstrated in the development of History of India or the question of the relationship between the Muslims and the other communities. It was in this context that Allama Iqbal delivered his presidential address. Iqbal, political thoughts developed in three phases.

1st Phase: Pre-1905
The first phase pertains to the pre-1905 period, before delivering the address Iqbal addresses the factors for the decline of the Muslims and he tries to focus on Indian nationality, nationhood or Indian unity. Iqbal explained about resolving differences in his book Bang-i-Dara and writes Tarānah-i-Hindī and Naya shawala to reunite Muslims with Hindus.

2nd Phase: The Stay in Europe 1905-08
The second phase pertains the period from 1905 to 1908, Iqbal spent these years in Europe, during his higher education and in Germany at Munich University for PhD. His stay in England helps to crystallize his ideas. Iqbal appreciated certain things in the West, for example, the quest for knowledge, their efforts for innovation and change. Iqbal was critical of materialism, capitalism and competition an unrestricted and unlimited competition that was undermining the society and it is during this period that he began to think philosophically and scientifically about the Muslims and he emphasized on the importance of spiritualism in one's life.

3rd Phase: Return to India 1908 and onward
The third phase occurs when Iqbal comes back to India after his education. Here his exclusive attention and focus were on the Muslim. He talked about the centrality of Islam, the question of submission to God, Oneness of God, He emphasized in his writings pros as well as poetry and he talked about Muhammad (SA) as the ideal leader as the leader that the Muslims should try to follow. However, his focus was on primarily Muslims of this region when he dealt with the political or the constitutional issues of India. Iqbal got the title of SIR in 1922 in recognition of his intellectual work. In 1927 Iqbal was elected to the Punjab Legislative Council, so far next little over two years he served in the Punjab legislative council that is from 1927 to 1930, little over two years.

Revival of Islamic polity

Iqbal's six English lectures were published first from Lahore in 1930 and then by Oxford University press in 1934 in a book titled The Reconstruction of Religious Thought in Islam. Which were read at Madras, Hyderabad and Aligarh. These lectures dwell on the role of Islam as a religion as well as a political and legal philosophy in the modern age. In these lectures Iqbal firmly rejects the political attitudes and conduct of Muslim politicians, whom he saw as morally misguided, attached to power and without any standing with Muslim masses.

Iqbal expressed fears that not only would secularism weaken the spiritual foundations of Islam and Muslim society, but that India's Hindu-majority population would crowd out Muslim heritage, culture and political influence. In his travels to Egypt, Afghanistan, Iran and Turkey, he promoted ideas of greater Islamic political co-operation and unity, calling for the shedding of nationalist differences. He also speculated on different political arrangements to guarantee Muslim political power; in a dialogue with Dr. B. R. Ambedkar, Iqbal expressed his desire to see Indian provinces as autonomous units under the direct control of the British government and with no central Indian government. He envisaged autonomous Muslim provinces in India. Under one Indian union, he feared for Muslims, who would suffer in many respects especially with regard to their existentially separate entity as Muslims.
The Muslims of subcontinent were degraded both by British people and Hindus. After the advent of 1857, British people turn against Muslims thinking that they are only culprits and similarly Hindus want complete control over Muslims and they want to change constitution where Muslims should be suppressed and by not giving Muslims any importance. It was the cause due to which Iqbal presents his idea of uniting Muslims and Muslim majority areas such as Punjab, Sindh, Baluchistan and NWFP.

Address 1930
Iqbal was elected president of the Muslim League in 1930 at its session in Allahabad, in the United Provinces as well as for the session in Lahore in 1932. In his presidential address on 30 December 1930, Iqbal outlined a vision of an independent state for Muslim-majority provinces in northwestern India.

The Address basis
In 1930 Iqbal delivered the Presidential Address the Allahabad Address, before address Iqbal also delivered landmark lectures on Islam in 1928 and 1929 in Aligarh, Hyderabad and Madras. Because Iqbal's address eye-plot was based on Islam. Iqbal's views on Islam and introversion with the modern conditions and modern situation helps him to generate the Allahabad Address. In 1932, Iqbal also presided over All India Conference that was held at Lahore and during that conference, he repeated some of the ideas and some of the thoughts which he had presented in his Address at 1930.

The Address outline
In his address, Iqbal called for the creation of "a Muslim India within India", especially in North-western India. Iqbal demanded the right of self-government for the Muslims. as he said:

Within his address, Iqbal also touched on his fear that Islam may have a similar fate as Christianity. "To Islam, matter is spirit realising itself in space and time" whereas Europe had "accepted the separation of Church and State and disliked the fact that their leaders were "indirectly forcing the world to accept it as unquestionable dogma [...] I do not know what will be the final fate of the national idea in the world of Islam. Whether Islam will assimilate and transform it as it has before assimilated and transformed many ideas expressive of a different spirit, or allow a radical transformation of its own structure by the force of this idea, is hard to predict. Professor Wensinck of Leiden (Holland) wrote to me the other day: "It seems to me that Islam is entering upon a crisis through which Christianity has been passing for more than a century. The great difficulty is how to save the foundations of religion when many antiquated notions have to be given up."

Iqbal spoke of:

In regards to the army, Iqbal stated:

Iqbal also addresses how it was "painful to observe" the failed attempts to "discover such a principle of internal harmony". However, he still felt "hopeful". He expressed great concerns that the British politicians were "cleverly exploiting Hindu-Muslim differences regarding the ultimate form of Central Government" through Princes of the Princely States. He was also critical of the Simon Report that it did great "injustice to Muslims" to not be given a statutory majority for Punjab and Bengal. Furthermore, he demanded Sindh to be united with Baluchistan and turned into a separate province as it did not have anything in common with Bombay Presidency.

Comparing the European democracy to Indian democracy, he justified the Muslim demand for a "Muslim India within India", saying:

Commenting on the Hindu fears of religious rule in the Muslim autonomous states, Iqbal said:

In his concluding remarks, Iqbal said:

Importance
Iqbal's address was known to have a forceful and logical presentation of the Muslim case in India. His address arises the awareness why should Muslims be treated as a political entity rather than a minority. His address highlights the following views that would prove highly beneficial in future.

 Territorial adjustments will enable the Muslims to develop themselves in accordance with their ideas and serve the cause of Ummah.
 Redistribution of territory developed later on the concept of a Muslim homeland.
 He further expressed these ideas in letters to Jinnah from May 1936 to November 1937. He talked of a separate federation of Muslim provinces. The North Western India and Bengal can be considered as entitled to self-determination like other nations in India and outside. Shariah's development is impossible without a free Muslim state or states. He advised the Muslims to be above self-interest and devote themselves to Islam.
 In difficult times, Islam has saved the Muslims.
 Faith, culture and historical traditions are more important than patriotism.

See also
 Index of Muhammad Iqbal–related articles
 Islam in India
 Islam in Pakistan
 Islam in Bangladesh
 Islam in Egypt
 Islam in Russia

References

External links

 Allahabad Address at the Allama Iqbal.com
 Allahabad Address at the Columbia University

1930 in British India
Pakistan Movement
History of Allahabad
Muhammad Iqbal
1930 speeches